6 Kiss may refer to:
 6 Kiss (album), a 2009 album by Lil B
 "6 Kiss" (song), a 2019 song by Trippie Redd